Live Action at ROCK ALL, Oslo is a live seven-inch EP by Brainbombs.  It was released in 1994 by Big Ball Records in Sweden, then compiled on Singles Compilation CD in 1999.

Track listing

Side one
"No Guilt"
"Wishing a Slow Death"

Side two
"Stacy"
"Burning Hell"

1994 EPs
Live EPs
1994 live albums